The list of ship launches in 1919 includes a chronological list of ships launched in 1919.  In cases where no official launching ceremony was held, the date built or completed may be used instead.

January

February

March

April

May

June

July

August

September

October

November

December

Unknown date

Summary

References 

Sources

1919
 Ship launches
 Ship launches
Ship launches